Vodogino is a rural locality (a village) in Leskovskoye Rural Settlement, Vologodsky District, Vologda Oblast, Russia. The population was 28 as of 2002. There are 4 streets.

Geography 
Vodogino is located 19 km west of Vologda (the district's administrative centre) by road. Pochinok is the nearest rural locality.

References 

Rural localities in Vologodsky District